Aristidis Soiledis (born 8 February 1991) is a Greek professional footballer who plays as a left-back.He also participated and landed in second place in the Greek version of the worldwide reality show "Survivor". He is engaged to his girlfriend of four years Maria-Andona.

Club career
Soiledis started his career football career at Olympiacos. He made his first team debut in Super League against Levadeiakos during the 2008–2009 season coming as a substitution for Sebastian Leto. Acknowledging his potential and in order to gain much needed experience, the team soon loaned him for two successive seasons to OFI and Levadiakos. On 31 August 2011, Olympiakos announced the release of the player, who did not succeed to gain sufficient time with the first team.
After his release from Olympiakos he signed a two-year contract with Doxa Drama playing in Football League. On 1 August 2013 the 22-year-old midfielder signed a 1+1-year contract with "blue white" in Football League aiming the accession to Super League.

On 7 June 2014, Soiledis signed a three-year deal with AEK Athens. On 6 July 2016, he mutually solved his contract with AEK, having 41 appearances (2 goals, 5 assists) in all competitions. On 7 July 2016, he signed a contract with Cypriot club Omonia. On 15 July 2017 he returned to the Superleague joining Kerkyra on a one-year contract.

On 19 July 2018, Soiledis signed a year contract with Romanian Liga I club FC Botoșani. In the summer of 2019, Liga I club FSCB announced the signing of the Greek defender for a €75.000 transfer fee, but according to various reports, he has been showing signs of professional regression since he was a member of the club. He was injured for a long time, and some people from the club accused him of starting to invent diagnoses just to not play. In the beginning of 2022, the Greek press has confirmed that Soiledis has been accepted in the Survivor Greece, a TV contest, and actually terminates his career with the club.

International career
He appeared for the Greece national under-21 football team 13 times.

Career statistics

Club
Statistics accurate as of match played 27 September 2020.

Honours
Olympiacos
 Greek Super League: 2008, 2009
 Greek Cup: 2008, 2009
 Greek Super Cup: 2007

Niki Volos
 Football League: 2014

AEK Athens
 Football League: 2015 (South Group)
 Greek Cup: 2016

FCSB

 Cupa României: 2019–20

References

 Debut

External links
Onsports.gr Profile
 
Olympiacos F.C. – Players Profile
Greece U19 – Players Profile

1991 births
Living people
People from Boeotia
Greek footballers
Super League Greece players
Football League (Greece) players
Olympiacos F.C. players
OFI Crete F.C. players
Levadiakos F.C. players
Doxa Drama F.C. players
Niki Volos F.C. players
AEK Athens F.C. players
PAE Kerkyra players
Cypriot First Division players
AC Omonia players
Liga I players
FC Botoșani players
FC Steaua București players
Greek expatriate footballers
Greek expatriate sportspeople in Cyprus
Expatriate footballers in Cyprus
Greek expatriate sportspeople in Romania
Expatriate footballers in Romania
Association football fullbacks
Footballers from Central Greece
Survivor Greece contestants